Satya Pal Malik (born 24 July 1946) is an Indian politician. Malik was the Governor of the erstwhile state of Jammu and Kashmir, from August 2018 to October 2019, and it was during his tenure that the constitutional decision to abrogate Article 370, which gave special status to J&K, was taken on 5 August 2019. Later he was moved to Goa as its 18th governor, and after that he served as the 21st Governor of Meghalaya until October 2022. 

His first prominent stint as a politician was as a member of Uttar Pradesh Legislative Assembly during 1974–77. He represented Uttar Pradesh in Rajya Sabha from 1980 to 1986 and 1986–89. He was member of the 9th Lok Sabha from Aligarh, from 1989 to 1991, as member of Janata Dal.  He was the Governor of Bihar from October 2017 to August 2018. On 21 March 2018 he was also given additional charge to serve as Governor of Odisha up to 28 May 2018. In August 2018, he was appointed Governor to the state of Jammu and Kashmir.

Early life and education 
Malik was born in Hisawada village of Baghpat, Uttar Pradesh in a Jat family. He pursued Bachelor of Science and LLB degrees from Meerut College. In 1968-69, Malik was elected as the students union president, commencing his political career.

Politics

Early state politics
Malik was first elected to any public office was as a member of legislative assembly from Baghpat after he successfully contested the election as member of Charan Singh's Bharatiya Kranti Dal. He won the election by receiving 42.36% of the votes cast and defeating his nearest rival Acharya Deepankar of the Communist party of India who got 31.57% of the total votes cast. Later, after the formation of Bharatiya Lok Dal, he joined the party and become the general secretary of Lok Dal.

National politics
 1980-89 : Rajya Sabha Member from Uttar Pradesh
 1989-91 : Member of Lok Sabha from Aligarh, on Janata Dal ticket
 1996  :  Lost Lok Sabha Election from Aligarh on SP ticket, came fourth with only 40,789 votes.
 2012 : Appointed National Vice President of BJP

Governor of States
 30 September 2017 – 21 August 2018 : Governor of Bihar
 23 August 2018 – 30 October 2019 : Governor of Jammu and Kashmir
 3 November 2019 - 18 August 2020 : Governor of Goa
 18 August  2020- 3 October 2022 : Governor of Meghalaya

Post-governorship

Support for farmers' agitation

On 8 November 2021, Malik was invited to Global Jat Summit and in his speech, he used provocative messages against the Indian government regarding the 2020–2021 Indian farmers' protest and said "you will not be able to overcome the Sikhs. The Guru's four children were slaughtered, but the Guru refused to surrender. You cannot defeat the Jats either."

He also added, "Indira Gandhi knew that she would be killed and she was killed [for ordering Bluestar]. They killed General Vaidya in Pune [for leading Bluestar] and Michael O'Dwyer in London. I have even said that don't test the patience of the Sikh community."

See also 
Balbir Singh Rajewal
Rakesh Tikait

References 

|-

|-

|-

|-

|-

|-

1946 births
Living people
Janata Dal politicians
People from Meerut district
Politicians from Aligarh
India MPs 1989–1991
Lok Sabha members from Uttar Pradesh
Rajya Sabha members from Uttar Pradesh
Uttar Pradesh MLAs 1974–1977
Bharatiya Janata Party politicians from Uttar Pradesh
Samajwadi Party politicians
Governors of Bihar
Governors of Jammu and Kashmir
Governors of Goa